Deer is an English surname. Notable people with the surname include:

Ada Deer (born 1935), Native American leader
Brian Deer (21st century), British investigative reporter
Gary Mule Deer (born 1939), American comedian
Gene Deer (21st century), American blues guitarist
George Deer (1890-1974), British politician
James Young Deer (1876-1946), Native American film actor
Rob Deer (born 1960), American baseball player

See also
Dear (surname)
Deere